The 2000 United States presidential election in South Carolina took place on November 7, 2000, and was part of the 2000 United States presidential election. Voters chose 8 representatives, or electors to the Electoral College, who voted for president and vice president.

South Carolina was won by Governor George W. Bush by a 15.92% margin of victory. , this is the last election in which Sumter County voted for the Republican.

Primaries

Republican Primary
The Republican primary was held on February 19, 2000, with 37 delegates at stake. South Carolina would prove to be a crucially important state for then-Gov. George W. Bush after losing to Sen. John McCain in New Hampshire by 18 points. Bush won the South Carolina primary by an 11.5% margin, and took the lion's share of the delegates at stake.

Candidates
Governor George W. Bush of Texas
Former Ambassador Alan Keyes of Maryland
Senator John McCain of Arizona

Withdrawn
Former Undersecretary of Education Gary Bauer of Kentucky
Businessman Steve Forbes of New Jersey
Senator Orrin Hatch of Utah

Results

Democratic Caucuses
The Democratic caucuses were held on March 7, with 43 delegates at stake. As the only major candidate left in the race, Vice President Al Gore easily won all the delegates.

Candidates
 Vice President Al Gore of Tennessee
 William Kreml of South Carolina

Withdrawn
 U.S. Senator Bill Bradley of New Jersey

Results

Results

By county

Counties that flipped from Democratic to Republican
Abbeville (Largest city: Abbeville)
Calhoun (Largest city: St. Matthews)
Chesterfield (Largest city: Cheraw)
Colleton (Largest city: Walterboro)
Darlington (Largest city: Hartsville)
Georgetown (Largest city: Murrells Inlet)
Lancaster (Largest city: Lancaster)
Sumter (Largest city: Sumter)
Union (Largest city: Union)

By congressional district
Bush won 5 of 6 congressional districts, including a district won by a Democrat.

Electors 

The electors of each state and the District of Columbia met on December 18, 2000 to cast their votes for president and vice president. The Electoral College itself never meets as one body. Instead the electors from each state and the District of Columbia met in their respective capitols.

The following were the members of the Electoral College from the state. All were pledged to and voted for George Bush and Dick Cheney:
Cynthia F. Costa
Danny R. Faulkner
Thomas H. McLean
William B. Prince
Dan Richardson
Douglas L. Wavle
Cecil F. Windham Sr.
Buddy Witherspoon

See also
 2000 Republican Party presidential primaries
 South Carolina primary

References

South Carolina
2000
Presidential